{{Infobox person
| name                = Masao Urino売野雅勇
| image               =
| caption             = 
| birth_name          = 
| alias               = Reiji Asō (麻生麗二 Asō Reiji')'
| birth_date          = 
| birth_place         = Ashikaga, Tochigi, Japan
| death_date          = 
| death_place         = 
| occupation          = Songwriter and film director
| years_active        = 
| website             = 
}}
 is a Japanese lyricist, script writer, and film director. He has written lyrics for many musical groups and individual artists, sometimes under the pseudonym .

After graduating from Tochigi Prefectural Ashikaga High School, he graduated in 1974 with a degree in literature from Sophia University. After graduating, he worked as a copy writer for the advertising firm , which went bankrupt in 1999. Due to missing an error in an advertisement in a national newspaper, though, he was forced to do other work. While working at Tōkyū Agency International (now Frontage), he made his lyricist debut with the 1981 Chanels song Hoshi Kuzu no Dance Hall.

In 1982, he had a big hit with the Akina Nakamori song Shōjo A. From there, he wrote the lyrics for a series of hit songs sung by Hiroaki Serizawa, and for the J-pop group The Checkers (Namida no Request). He has written lyrics for artists including Hidemi Ishikawa, Jun'ichi Inagaki, Daisuke Inoue, Hiromi Iwasaki, Yoshimi Iwasaki, Tomio Umezawa, Yukiko Okada, Yōko Oginome, Carlos Toshiki & Omega Tribe, Naoko Kawai, Yuri Kunizane, Masahiko Kondō, Kiyotaka Sugiyama, Tomomi Nishimura, Yū Hayami, Chiemi Hori, Junko Miyama, and others.

Urino made his directorial and script writing debut in 1990 with the film Cinderella Express''.

Works

Sources:

References

Japanese film directors
1951 births
Japanese lyricists
Japanese screenwriters
People from Tochigi Prefecture
Living people
Omega Tribe (Japanese band) members
Sophia University alumni